The Afar Region, formerly known as Region 2, is a regional state in northeastern Ethiopia and the homeland of the Afar people. Its capital is the planned city of Semera, which lies on the paved Awash–Assab highway. It’s bordered by Eritrea to the north and Djibouti to the northeast, and shares regional borders with the Tigray, Amhara, Oromo and Somali regions.

The Afar Triangle, the northern part of which is the Danakil Depression, is part of the Great Rift Valley of Ethiopia, and is located in the north of the region. It has the lowest point in Ethiopia and one of the lowest in Africa. The southern part of the region consists of the valley of the Awash River, which empties into a string of lakes along the Ethiopian–Djibouti border. Other notable landmarks include the Awash National Park.

Demographics 
Based on the 2017 projections by the Central Statistical Agency of Ethiopia (CSA), the Afar Regional State has a population of 1,812,002, consisting of 991,000 men and 821,002 women; urban inhabitants number 346,000 of the population, a further 1,466,000 were pastoralists.

Based on the 2007 Census conducted by the Central Statistical Agency of Ethiopia (CSA), the Afar Regional State has a population of 1,390,273, consisting of 775,117 men and 615,156 women; urban inhabitants number 185,135 or 13.32% of the population, a further 409,123 or 29.43% were pastoralists. With an estimated area of 96,707 square kilometers, this region has an estimated density of 14.38 people per square kilometer. For the entire region 247,255 households were counted, which results in an average for the Region of 5.6 persons to a household, with urban households having on average 4 and rural households 6 people.

In the previous census, conducted in 1994, the region's population was reported to be 1,106,383 of which 626,839 were men and 479,544 women; urban inhabitants were 85,879 or 7.76% of the population.

Afar is predominantly (89.96%) spoken in the region and is the working language of the state. Other languages with a significant number of speakers in the state include Amharic (6.83%), Tigrinnya (1.06%), Argobba (0.79%), Wolaitta (0.43%),  and Oromifa (0.4%).

According to the CSA, 48.57% of the total population had access to safe drinking water, of whom 26.89% were rural inhabitants and 78.11% were urban. Values for other reported common indicators of the standard of living for the Afar Regional State  include the following: 67.3% of the inhabitants fall into the lowest wealth quintile; adult literacy for men is 27% and for women 15.6%; and the regional infant mortality rate is 61 infant deaths per 1,000 live births, which is less than the nationwide average of 77; at least half of these deaths occurred in the infants’ first month of life. On 20 April 2007, the regional government announced that it had increased health coverage from 34% to 40%, the result of construction of 64 new health clinics, increasing the total for the region to 111.

Land features 

Afar Depression, Erta Ale active volcano, Awash National Park, Yangudi Rassa National Park, Hadar and Aramis areas, are the major tourist attraction area of the region. The hot springs, Afar culture and cultural games are other attraction areas.

In 2005, a giant rift was formed in just a few days. The rift opened when the Dabbahu Volcano, situated in the north of the region, erupted. The crack forming is thought to be part of the process in which the Arabian Plate and the two African plates, the Nubian Plate and the Somali Plate, are moving apart.

Environment 
The Afar Depression, a plate tectonic triple junction, is found in the Afar Regional State. This geologic feature is one of Earth's great active volcanic areas. Due to this volcanic activity the floor of the depression is composed of lava, mostly basalt.
The continuous process of volcanism results in the occurrence of major minerals, including potash, sulfur, salt, bentonite and gypsum. In addition to these minerals, there are also promising geothermal energy sources and hot springs in different areas of the region. Most of the region's mineral potential are found in Dallol, Berhale and Afdera woredas of Zone Two. Elidar, Dubti and Millee in Zone One, and Gewane in Zone Three, also have some mineral possibilities.

Afar is home to peculiar wild life, which notably include the African wild ass, Grevy's zebra, wild fox, wild cat, cheetah, and ostrich. These wild animals are found in the region's national parks. Because the region's tourism development is still in a poor state there are only two lodges in Awash National Park.

Agriculture 
The CSA estimated in 2005 that farmers in the Afar Regional State had a total of 327,370 cattle (representing 0.84% of Ethiopia's total cattle), 196,390 sheep (1.13%), 483,780 goats (3.73%), 200 mules (0.14%), 12,270 asses (0.49%), 99,830 camels (21.85%), 38,320 poultry of all species (0.12%), and 810 beehives (less than 0.1%). The CSA estimated on the basis of a survey performed in December 2003 that nomadic inhabitants had 1,990,850 cattle (an 83.8% share of those animals in the region that year), 2,303,250 sheep (90.6%), 3,960,510 goats (90%), 759,750 camels (85.9%), 175,180 asses (92.5%), 2960 mules (88.6%), and 900 horses (100%).

Regional instability 
, the area has been increasingly unstable, as tensions between Ethiopia and Eritrea remain high after the Eritrean–Ethiopian War of 1998 to 2000. On January 18, 2012, five foreign tourists were murdered while on holiday in the region. The Ethiopian government has accused Eritrean gunmen of being responsible for the attack. Many governments around the world advise against traveling to the Afar region, citing increasing security concerns.

Fossil finds 

Hadar, a community in Afar, was the site of the discovery in 1973–74 of "Lucy", the Australopithecus afarensis skeletal remains, by Donald Johanson of the Cleveland Museum of Natural History. On March 5, 2005, another skeleton, estimated to be 3.8 million years old and said to be the world's oldest bipedal hominid skeleton, was found in the region. Yohannes Haile-Selassie led digs there each year from 2004 to 2007.

On March 24, 2006, it was reported that a "significantly complete" cranium had been found at Gawis in the Gona area. The cranium appears as an intermediate form between Homo erectus and Homo sapiens.

On October 1, 2009, scientists reported that they had found a skeleton, which dates around 4.4 million years ago. Named Ardi, it is a form of the species Ardipithecus ramidus. The specimen is a distant cousin of the Australopithecus afarensis, Lucy's species.

In June 2010, the oldest direct evidence of stone tool manufacture was found in the Afar region and attributed to Australopithecus afarensis.

In 2013, a graduate student from the Arizona State University discovered a hominid jawbone in the Ledi-Geraru region of Afar. Scientists estimated that the fossil dates back around 2.8 million years ago, which is 400,000 years before the next oldest hominid fossil remains.

In 2015, a hominin jawbone and teeth was discovered in the Afar region. Scientists believe that the bones belonged to a previously undiscovered ancestor. The new species was named "Australopithecus deyiremeda", meaning "close relative" in the native Afar language. The species lived around 3.5–3.3 million years ago, about the same time period as other hominins such as Australopithecus afarensis.

List of Chief Administrator of the Afar Region
Habib Alimirah (ALF) 1991? - 1995
Hanfare Alimirah (ALF) September 1995 - Mar 1996
Ismaqil Qali Siro (APDO/ANDP) March 1996–September 2015
Awol Arba Unde (acting) September 2015 - November 2015
Seyoum Awol (ANDP) 16 November 2015 - 16 December 2018
Awol Arba Unde  (ANDP)  17 December 2018 – present

(This list is based on information from Worldstatesmen.org.)

Administrative zones 
Like other regions in Ethiopia, Afar is subdivided into administrative zones (and one special woreda, an administrative subdivision which is an autonomous area and is not part of a zone).
Awsi Rasu
Kilbet Rasu
Gabi Rasu
Fanti Rasu
Hari Rasu
Mahi Rasu
Argobba (special woreda)

See also
List of districts in the Afar region
Regions of Ethiopia
Afar–Somali clashes

Notes and references

External links

Danakil depression
Map of Afar Region at DPPA of Ethiopia (PDF file)
Afar Triangle
Large collection of photos from an expedition to the Danakil
Afar Rift Consortium homepage
Interview with Afar president, Ismael Ali Sirro, IRIN 24 May 2002

 
Regions of Ethiopia
States and territories established in 1992